Marilyn Ramenofsky (born August 20, 1946) is an American former competition swimmer, Olympic medalist, and former world record-holder.  She is currently a researcher at the University of California at Davis, studying the physiology and behavior of bird migration.  She has previously done research at the University of Washington in Seattle.

Swimming career
Ramenofsky was named to the Amateur Athletic Union (AAU) All-America women's swimming teams in 1962, 1963 and 1964.  International Swimming Hall of Fame national director Buck Dawson wrote:  "[Ramenofsky] was the first female to swim a perfect freestyle stroke."  She attended Pomona College in Claremont, California, and trained with the Pomona College men's swim team because the college had no women's team.

Ramenofsky set new world-record times for the 400-meter freestyle three times in 1964, including once at the U.S. Olympic Trials, reducing the record to 4:39.5.  She also set a new U.S. record in the 220-yard freestyle in 1964, at 2:17.3.

At the 1964 Summer Olympics in Tokyo, Japan, she represented the United States.  She received a silver medal for her second-place performance in the women's 400-meter freestyle, breaking the existing Olympic record with a time of 4:47.7, but finishing behind American teammate Ginny Duenkel.

At the 1961 Maccabiah Games she won a gold medal in the 400-meter freestyle relay and a bronze in the 400-meter freestyle.  At the 1965 Maccabiah Games she won gold medals in both the 200-meter and 400-meter freestyles.

Life after swimming
Ramenofsky, who is Jewish, was inducted into the International Jewish Sports Hall of Fame in 1988.

Ramenofsky has published numerous peer reviewed articles on the physiology and behavior of migratory birds, most notably the white-crowned sparrow.  Much of her research has focused on how glucocorticoids may orchestrate the suite of life history changes associated with bird migration.  She now works at UC Davis studying the migration of birds, and changes in their muscle physiology during stages of migration.

See also

 List of Olympic medalists in swimming (women)
 List of Pomona College people
 List of select Jewish swimmers
 World record progression 400 metres freestyle

References

External links
  Marilyn Ramenofsky – Athlete profile at National Jewish Sports Hall of Fame and Museum
 Image of Marilyn Ramenofsky with coach Peter Daland, California, 1964. Los Angeles Times Photographic Archive (Collection 1429). UCLA Library Special Collections, Charles E. Young Research Library, University of California, Los Angeles.

1946 births
Living people
American female freestyle swimmers
World record setters in swimming
Jewish American sportspeople
Jewish swimmers
Competitors at the 1961 Maccabiah Games
Competitors at the 1965 Maccabiah Games
Maccabiah Games gold medalists for the United States
Maccabiah Games bronze medalists for the United States
Maccabiah Games medalists in swimming
Olympic silver medalists for the United States in swimming
Pomona College alumni
Sportspeople from Phoenix, Arizona
Swimmers at the 1964 Summer Olympics
Medalists at the 1964 Summer Olympics
21st-century American Jews
21st-century American women